Roger Duclos Moute a Bidias (born 22 April 1995) is a Cameroonian basketball player for Olympique Antibes of the LNB Pro B. Standing at , he mainly plays as small forward. Moute a Bidias also plays for the Cameroon national team.

Early life
Born in Yaoundé, Moute a Bidias played basketball for the first time when he was a high school freshman.

College career
Moute a Bidias played four seasons for the California Golden Bears. He was described as a defensive specialist of the team. Throughout his career, he frequently received advice from NBA-player Luc Mbah a Moute.

Professional career
Moute a Bidias was signed by the Raptors 905 of the NBA G League after playing in an open try-out. However, he was injured during training camp and was released. In February, he was added to the Raptors roster again. He appeared in four games in the 2017–18 NBA G League season.

The following season, he played for the Rio Grande Valley Vipers.

On 17 January 2020, the Santa Cruz Warriors acquired Moute a Bidias.

On 22 October 2021, Moute a Bidias signed with Apollo Amsterdam of the BNXT League.

On 13 April 2022, Moute a Bidias signed with the Edmonton Stingers of the CEBL.

National team career 
Moute a Bidias made his debut for the Cameroon national basketball team in 2022 in the 2023 FIBA Basketball World Cup qualifiers.

References

External links

1995 births
Living people
Apollo Amsterdam players
Basketball players from Yaoundé
California Golden Bears men's basketball players
Cameroonian expatriate basketball people in Canada
Cameroonian expatriate basketball people in France
Cameroonian expatriate basketball people in the United States
Cameroonian expatriate sportspeople in the Netherlands
Cameroonian men's basketball players
Raptors 905 players
Rio Grande Valley Vipers players
Santa Cruz Warriors players
Small forwards